The Turbine Theatre is a commercial theatre on the banks of the River Thames at Battersea in the London Borough of Wandsworth, which opened in 2019.

The theatre was established as part of the redevelopment of Battersea Power Station. The inaugural artistic director is Paul Taylor-Mills, who was previously artistic director of Andrew Lloyd Webber's The Other Palace theatre.

The theatre is a public space by day, and theatre by night, seating 94. It is located within railway arches under the Grosvenor Bridge.

The opening production was Harvey Fierstein's Torch Song Trilogy  featuring Matthew Needham as Arnold, followed by High Fidelity, set in London as in Nick Hornby's original novel.

References

Theatres in the London Borough of Wandsworth
2019 establishments in England
Producing house theatres in London
Theatres completed in 2019